David Hawkshaw (born 3 July 1999) is an Irish rugby union player, currently playing for Irish provincial side Connacht in the URC. His preferred position is centre. He went to school in Belvedere College and played schools rugby there.

Leinster
Hawkshaw signed an academy contract for Leinster in 2018, becoming a 3rd year academy player in August 2020. He made his Leinster debut in Round 4 of the 2020–21 Pro14 against Glasgow Warriors.

References

External links
itsrugby.co.uk Profile

1999 births
Living people
Irish rugby union players
Leinster Rugby players
Rugby union centres
Rugby union players from Dublin (city)
People educated at Belvedere College
Connacht Rugby players